KS 4 may refer to:
Key Stage 4, of British secondary education
Kansas's 4th congressional district, United States House of Representatives
K-4 (Kansas highway), American road